The Jewel in the Crown is a 1984 British television serial about the final days of the British Raj in India during and after World War II, based upon the Raj Quartet novels (1965–1975) by British author Paul Scott. Granada Television produced the series for the ITV network.

Plot
The serial opens in the midst of World War II in the fictional Indian city of Mayapore, against the backdrop of the last years of the British Raj and the Indian independence movement. Hari Kumar is a young Indian man who was educated at Chillingborough, a British public school; he identifies as English rather than Indian. The bankruptcy of his father, a formerly successful businessman, forces him to return to India to live with his aunt.

Working as a journalist, Kumar now occupies a lower social status in India, and lives between two worlds, British and Indian. Numerous Anglo-Indians discriminate against him, and he is held in some suspicion by Indian independence activists. During this time, violent anti-British demonstrations are taking place in the city. Hari becomes romantically involved with Daphne Manners, a young British woman who shows an egalitarian attitude to Indians. One night, after Hari and Daphne make love in the public Bibighar Gardens, the couple are attacked by a group of Indian men. Hari is beaten and Daphne is gang raped.

Ronald Merrick, a young lower-middle-class Englishman, is intelligent and hardworking. He is the local Indian Police superintendent. Merrick once professed to be romantically interested in Daphne, though she politely but firmly rebuffed him. He arrests Hari for her rape, holding him in the local jail. Hari is beaten and sexually humiliated. Merrick resents Hari's privileged education and disdains Daphne's preferring the young Indian to him. When Daphne refuses to cooperate with the investigation, the police do not prosecute Hari for rape. However, Kumar and other young, educated Indians, are jailed without trial under the security regulations adopted to suppress the Indian independence movement. Word that Hari was tortured causes outrage in the Indian community. Merrick is transferred from Mayapore to a smaller and less important town in the province.

Daphne learns she is pregnant. She chooses to believe Hari is the father, rather than one of the rapists. She dies in childbirth. The mixed-race daughter, Parvati, is taken in by Daphne's great-aunt, Lady Manners, widow of a former provincial governor. While Lady Manners takes the infant to the resort area of Srinagar, she meets Sarah Layton, a young British woman vacationing with her mother, Mildred, and sister, Susan. Sarah and Susan's father is the colonel of the Indian Army regiment in Pankot, a hill station near Mayapore. He is being held as a prisoner of war in Germany, after his unit was captured early in the war.  Susan and their mother prefer to stay away from Lady Manners due to the scandal of her great-niece's illegitimate birth, but Sarah pays a call on Lady Manners and the two women become friendly.

Sarah and her family soon encounter Merrick, who has left the police and procured a commission in the Indian Army. Teddie Bingham, an Indian Army officer and the fiancé of Sarah's sister Susan, is stationed in the nearby princely state of Mirat; Merrick, also assigned there, happens to share quarters with him. Because the unit is soon to leave for the border with Burma, Teddie and Susan have to marry in Mirat.  When Teddie's best man for the ceremony becomes ill, he asks Merrick to step in. Merrick, seeing a relationship with the upper-class Teddie and the Laytons as a means to career advancement, is pleased to help.  While Merrick and Teddie are driving to the ceremony a stone is thrown at their car, slightly injuring Teddie.  Merrick understands that he was the target of the attack, as this is one of a series of incidents suggesting he is being harassed because of his treatment of Kumar and the other suspects in the Manners case in Mayapore.

Shortly after the wedding, Teddie and Merrick leave for the Burma front with their unit. Teddie is soon killed in an ambush by the Japanese-sponsored Indian National Army (INA). Merrick is badly wounded trying to get Teddie to safety and is evacuated to a Calcutta hospital. When Sarah visits him (at Susan's request), she learns that his arm will be amputated and that his burned face is permanently disfigured. Merrick says that Teddie was ambushed because of him. Teddie had left their unit to try to persuade two Indian soldiers of his regiment, who had been captured by the Japanese and joined the INA, to surrender and come in. Merrick believes Teddie wanted to prove to him that the Indian soldiers would resume their loyalty to the British when given the chance.

Lady Manners presses for a formal inquiry into Hari Kumar's arrest and detention. Nigel Rowan, an aide to the governor of the province conducts the interview with Hari, who learns during it that Daphne died. After Rowan establishes that Merrick tortured Hari and there is no evidence of any wrongdoing, he arranges Hari's release. No action is taken against Merrick, however.

After convalescing, Merrick is promoted and assigned to intelligence activities concerning the INA and Indian soldiers who collaborated with the enemy. He comes across the Laytons again in Bombay, where Sarah is reunited with her father, Colonel Layton, just released from a German POW camp.  Merrick is there to interrogate an Indian soldier who had served under Colonel Layton and assisted the Germans after Layton's unit was captured, and who has been deported to India. Merrick gains assistance from Sergeant Guy Perron, a young Cambridge graduate and Indian history scholar, who was serving with an Intelligence Corps Field Security unit; he speaks fluent Urdu and is asked to observe the interrogation.  Merrick learns that Perron also attended Chillingborough and knew Hari Kumar.

After the interrogation, Perron runs into Merrick and Sarah Layton at a party. He accompanies them to the apartment of Layton's aunt, where Sarah and her father are staying temporarily. Sarah and Perron are attracted to each other. Merrick decides to have Perron assigned to assist him in further investigations of Indian soldiers who became collaborators. Perron and Sarah both find Merrick distasteful, but Perron has no choice but to work with him.

After her husband Teddie's death and a difficult birth of their son, Susan Layton Bingham suffers a mental breakdown. She is treated in a hospital in Pankot. When Merrick returns to the Pankot area for his work, he courts Susan and ultimately marries her. Perron later learns that Merrick illegally gained access to Susan's medical records, apparently to learn about her mental state in order to persuade her to marry him. Susan's sister, Sarah, opposes the marriage, but is unable to prevent it.

With the surrender of Japan in August 1945, the war in the East is ended, and the days of British rule in India are clearly numbered. Perron arranges a quick exit from the Army to return to Cambridge and his academic career. Due to his imminent departure, he and Sarah suspend their relationship. Sarah's parents also plan to return to England. Merrick intends to stay on, having been offered a contract by the government of Mirat to reorganize their police force.

In 1947, with the transition to Indian independence under way, Perron returns to India as an historical observer. The conflict between Hindus and Muslims related to independence is tense. While visiting Mirat at the invitation of its Chief Minister, Count Bronowsky, whom he previously met in Bombay, Perron learns that Merrick is dead, officially from a riding accident. Bronowsky tells Perron that Merrick actually died during a sexual rendezvous with a young Indian man who was probably working for independent activists. It is believed the man allowed an assassin access to Merrick. The authorities cover up the details of Merrick's death, fearing reprisals from Indians during the political uncertainty with the British departure. The two discuss their view that, in leaving India, the British are opening up "Pandora's Box", releasing the ancient competition for power between the Hindus and Muslims, who had earlier conquered and ruled the country. Some confrontations had been restrained by the power of the British as rulers.

Sarah, Susan, and their aunt attend Merrick's funeral in Mirat. Perron accompanies them, along with Merrick's ashes, on the train back to Pankot. Joining them is Ahmed Kasim, the educated son of a prominent Muslim politician who has been working for Bronowsky in Mirat for the past few years. En route to Pankot, the train is stopped by Hindus, who attack Muslim passengers in retaliation for recent attacks on Hindus in Mirat. The attackers demand that Kasim be turned over to them. Kasim voluntarily leaves the train car and surrenders himself to the attackers, who murder him. Perron, Sarah, and the other English passengers are unharmed, but are horrified by the slaughter of Kasim and other Muslim passengers.

Before leaving India again, Perron tries to visit Hari Kumar, now living in a poor neighbourhood and supporting himself by tutoring Indian students in English. He leaves his calling card, as Kumar is out. Perron reflects on how Kumar was caught in an impossible position, between England and India.

Cast

 Peggy Ashcroft as Barbara Batchelor
 Janet Henfrey as Edwina Crane
 Derrick Branche as Ahmed Kasim
 Charles Dance as Sgt Guy Perron
 Geraldine James as Sarah Layton
 Rachel Kempson as Lady Manners
 Art Malik as Hari Kumar
 Wendy Morgan as Susan Layton
 Judy Parfitt as Mildred Layton
 Tim Pigott-Smith as Supt./Capt/Maj/Lt Col Ronald Merrick
 Eric Porter as Count Dmitri Bronowsky
 Susan Wooldridge as Daphne Manners
 Ralph Arliss as Capt. Samuels
 Geoffrey Beevers as Capt Kevin Coley
 James Bree as Maj/Lt Col Arthur Grace
 Jeremy Child as Robin White
 Warren Clarke as Cpl "Sophie" Dixon
 Rowena Cooper as Connie White
 Anna Cropper as  Nicky Paynton
 Fabia Drake as Mabel Layton
 Nicholas Farrell as Edward "Teddie" Bingham
 Matyelok Gibbs as Sister Ludmila Smith
 Carol Gillies as Clarissa Peplow
 Rennee Goddard as Dr Anna Klaus
 Jonathan Haley and Nicholas Haley as Edward Bingham Jr
 Saeed Jaffrey as Ahmed Ali Gaffur Kasim Bahadur, the Nawab of Mirat
 Karan Kapoor as Colin Lindsey
 Rashid Karapiet as Judge Menen
 Kamini Kaushal as Shalini Sengupta
 Rosemary Leach as Fenella "Fenny" Grace
 David Leland as Capt Leonard Purvis
 Nicholas Le Prevost as Capt Nigel Rowan
 Marne Maitland as Pandit Baba
 Jamila Massey as Maharanee Aimee
 Zia Mohyeddin as Mohammad Ali Kasim
 Salmaan Peerzada as Sayed Kasim
 Om Puri as Mr de Souza
 Stephen Riddle as Capt Dicky Beauvais
 Norman Rutherford as Edgar Maybrick
 Dev Sagoo as  S.V. Vidyasagar
 Zohra Sehgal as Lady Lili Chatterjee
 Frederick Treves as Lt Col John Layton
 Stuart Wilson as Capt James Clark
 Leslie Grantham as Signals Sergeant

Episodes

The following titles are as given on the DVD release. The first episode is double-length (105 minutes). All others are 53 minutes.

Soundtrack

The Jewel in the Crown is a soundtrack album by Anthony Randall and Orchestra performing the compositions of George Fenton that appeared in the miniseries, released in 1985. It was originally released on LP by Chrysalis Records and subsequently reissued on CD by EMI.

Track listing
All compositions by George Fenton

”Jewel in the Crown – Main Theme” – 2:32
”The Lakes” – 1:57
”The Triangle” – 3:48
”Crossing the River” – 2:22
”Imprisoned” – 2:03
”Death by Fire” – 2:35
Chillingborough School Song” – 1:47
”Butterflies Caught in a Web” – 4:25
”Daphne & Hari” – 3:44
”Mirat, Princely State” – 3:25
”Kedara and Waltz Kedara” – 6:12
”Barbie Leaves Rose Cottage/Champagne Charlie” – 2:30
”Guy Perron’s March” – 2:09
”Pankot - The Hills” – 3:02
”Jewel in the Crown – End Titles” – 1:50

Personnel
 George Fenton – arranger
 Anthony Randall – conductor
 Gavyn Wright – leader
 Clem Alford – sitar
 Clive Bell – flute
 Nicholas Maigrel – sarangui
 Keshav Sathe – tabla
 Leslie Pearson – piano on “Butterflies Caught in a Web”
 Michale Jeans – Cor anglais on “Daphne & Hari”

Production
Sir Denis Forman, then chairman of Granada Productions, wrote in 1983 that the impetus for doing an adaptation of the Raj Quartet was the success of Paul Scott's novel Staying On. The decision was made to attempt an adaptation of the quartet but to first test the company's ability to successfully complete a production in India by doing an adaptation of Staying On. With the success of that television film, plans proceeded for the quartet.

The series was shot on 16mm film, much of it on location in India. The scenes of the Nawab of Mirat's palace were filmed at Lake Palace in Udaipur. Besides all the Mirat scenes, Udaipur was also the location for Mayapore and some Pankot scenes. Shimla was the primary location for Pankot and many scenes were filmed in Mysore and Kashmir.

All filming not from India was filmed at Manchester's Granada Studios. The programme was often screened from grainy prints, but was fully remastered for its 2005 DVD release and ITV3 screening, resulting in much better picture quality.

Adaptation
The series is based on the Raj Quartet novels by Paul Scott:

 The Jewel in the Crown (1966)
 The Day of the Scorpion (1968)
 The Towers of Silence (1971)
 A Division of the Spoils (1975)

While the novels are written from different characters' viewpoints and move back and forth in time, the adaptation places events in roughly chronological order.

Cast
The series made stars of Art Malik and Charles Dance. Other leading actors included Peggy Ashcroft (who won the BAFTA Best TV Actress award for her performance), Tim Pigott-Smith, Geraldine James, Judy Parfitt, Rachel Kempson, Eric Porter, Susan Wooldridge, Zohra Sehgal, Saeed Jaffrey, and Karan Kapoor (son of Shashi Kapoor and Jennifer Kendal). The complexities of the plot ensured that no one character was at the centre of the action throughout.  All four "Best TV Actress" nominations at that year's BAFTAs went to stars of the series, with Ashcroft winning over Wooldridge, James and Parfitt. Pigott-Smith won Best TV Actor.

In a list of the 100 Greatest British Television Programmes compiled by the British Film Institute in 2000 and voted by industry professionals, The Jewel in the Crown placed 22nd.

Broader context
According to the Museum of Broadcast Communications there was "a cycle of film and television productions which emerged during the first half of the 1980s, which seemed to indicate Britain's growing preoccupation with India, Empire and a particular aspect of British cultural history". In addition to The Jewel in the Crown,  this cycle also included Gandhi (1982), Heat and Dust (1983), The Far Pavilions (1984) and A Passage to India (1984).

Mini-series co-star Charles Dance has commented how it has a devout following to this day. "I think that aired here in 1983, and there are people still to this day who assemble in each other’s houses and have Jewel In The Crown weekends and watch all 14 hours, mostly in America," he told Attention Deficit Delirium. "I have people stopping me in the street now saying that they watched Jewel In The Crown again a couple of months ago, and I think, 'Bloody hell, did you really?' So I’m known to that generation for a completely different type of work. The current film and television viewing audience is much younger, and the kind of things that I’m known for are these rather off-the-wall, slightly villainous characters in fantastical film and television things, but that’s okay. It’s better to be looked over than to be overlooked in my business."

Reception
In contemporary reviews, John J. O'Connor of The New York Times wrote, "the careful accumulation of marvelous detail is never less than fascinating. And once again in a British production, the performances are rarely less than extraordinary... What emerges in the end is a comprehension of India far more convincing than the posturings of a Rudyard Kipling and far deeper than the tightly focused biography of a Gandhi. The Jewel in the Crown is not only engrossing television. It is important television, a model of what the medium can do." Jeff Jarvis of People magazine called it "first-rate; the settings are stunning. It does a masterly job of making you care about its characters and what happens to them. That is what a mini-series is supposed to do, and Jewel does a spectacular job of it. It is this year’s best fictional mini." The Washington Post called the series "Ravishing, reverberant and profoundly sad" and regarding the setting; "The inscrutability of India to outsiders is not romanticized, just contemplated, celebrated, just as its intoxicating physical beauty is."

In reviewing the box-set video in 2010, Alexandra Coghlan of The Guardian wrote that the series "sits alongside Brideshead Revisited as the high-water mark of 1980s British TV."

References

External links
 
 Museum of Broadcast Communications 
 British Film Institute Screen Online

1984 British television series debuts
1984 British television series endings
1980s British drama television series
1980s British television miniseries
ITV television dramas
Television series by ITV Studios
Television series set in the 1940s
Television shows based on British novels
Peabody Award-winning television programs
Primetime Emmy Award for Outstanding Miniseries winners
Best Miniseries or Television Movie Golden Globe winners
International Emmy Award for Drama winners
Television shows produced by Granada Television
English-language television shows
Indian National Army in fiction
Television shows set in the British Raj